Sympherobius is a genus of brown lacewings in the family Hemerobiidae. There are at least 50 described species in Sympherobius.

Species

References

Further reading

 Makarkin, V.N.; Wedmann, S. 2009: First record of the genus Sympherobius (Neuroptera: Hemerobiidae) from Baltic amber. Zootaxa, 2078: 55–62.
 
 
 
 
 
 
 

Hemerobiiformia
Neuroptera genera